Julio Maragall  (born 1936) is a Spanish born Venezuelan sculptor and architect.

Biography
He was born in Barcelona, son of the sculptor Ernest Maragall. When he was three years old, his family went into exile in Venezuela, where his mother came from.

He studied architecture and sculpture at Cornell University in the United States, from which he graduated in 1966. He began his career in Ithaca, New York at Mario Romañac and Donald Belchers office. He later returned to Venezuela where he started working with Julio Volante. He graduated from the Simón Bolívar University in Miranda State, where he studied architectural design. In 1972 he founded his company Maragall&Co, and the same year he started teaching as a professor of architectural design on Simón Bolívar University. During these years he has developed a career as a sculptor and he has numerous solo exhibitions.

Works
ABA Tower in the Las Mercedes urbanization (1975),
Development and remodeling of the Hotel Margarita Hilton Internacional (1993).
Villa Bermeja (Chulavista), (1986)
Promenade of La Barceloneta, Spain (1996)
Paseo Jose Maria Vargas 2

References

This article was initially translated from the Spanish Wikipedia.

Spanish sculptors
Spanish male sculptors
Venezuelan sculptors
1954 births
Living people